Stilesville is a Canadian community, located in Westmorland County, New Brunswick. The community is situated in southeastern New Brunswick, to the north west of Moncton.  Stilesville is part of Greater Moncton.

Notable people

See also
List of communities in New Brunswick
Greater Moncton
List of entertainment events in Greater Moncton

Bordering communities

References

Communities in Westmorland County, New Brunswick
Communities in Greater Moncton